The GM-94 is a pump action grenade launcher developed by the KBP design bureau for use by Russian special and security forces.

Description
The GM-94 is a short range weapon, allowing it to be used in close urban environments. With a minimum safe distance of only 10 meters, the GM-94 is well suited to close, room-to-room fighting. Its simple design and operation allows it to operate in dusty and dirty environments and even after being immersed in water.

The launcher is capable of firing VGM-93.900 high explosive fragmentation, VGM-93.100 thermobaric, VGM-93.300 smoke and VGM-93.200 tear gas canisters, VGM-93.600 rubber slugs and other non-lethal payloads.

The VGM-93.100 thermobaric grenade contains around 160 grams of explosive filler. It can penetrate up to 8 mm of mild steel or interior wall, while producing minimal primary fragmentation.

In June 2005, GM-94 with thermobaric VGM-93.100 ammunition was adopted by the Russian Ministry of Internal Affairs. In October 2007, the Russian armed forces adopted a new launcher designated LPO-97 developed in the KBP Instrument Design Bureau on the basis of the GM-94 with a thermobaric grenade, in 2008 GM-94 adopted for the branches of the Federal Security Service. Though the launcher was intended for use by Russian security forces, the GM-94 has been spotted as far afield as Kazakhstan and Libya.

Russian forces have fired the tear gas version of canisters on protesters in Ukraine.

Users

See also
 RG-6 grenade launcher
 RGM-40 Kastet
 DP-64
 RGS-50M
 RGSh-30
 Neopup PAW-20
 China Lake grenade launcher

References

Bibliography
 

Grenade launchers of Russia
KBP Instrument Design Bureau products
Riot guns
Riot control weapons
Teargas grenade guns
Military equipment introduced in the 2000s